Livarot-Pays-d'Auge (literally Livarot Land of Auge) is a commune in the department of Calvados, northwestern France. The municipality was established on 1 January 2016 by merger of the 22 former communes of Livarot (the seat), Auquainville, Les Autels-Saint-Bazile, Bellou, Cerqueux, Cheffreville-Tonnencourt, La Croupte, Familly, Fervaques, Heurtevent, Le Mesnil-Bacley, Le Mesnil-Durand, Le Mesnil-Germain, Meulles, Les Moutiers-Hubert, Notre-Dame-de-Courson, Préaux-Saint-Sébastien, Sainte-Marguerite-des-Loges, Saint-Martin-du-Mesnil-Oury, Saint-Michel-de-Livet, Saint-Ouen-le-Houx and Tortisambert.

Population

See also 
Communes of the Calvados department

References

External links 
 

2016 establishments in France
Communes of Calvados (department)
Populated places established in 2016